KQPM is a radio station broadcasting a country music format in Ukiah, California.

External links

QPM